Another One Hypnotized By... is an EP by the band Thunderbirds Are Now!.  It was released by Acutest Records on April 1, 2003.

Track listing
"It's the End of the World, and I'm Still a Virgin"
"My Girl Is a Beard"
"Ingram St. Massacre (t-i 82 Remix)"
"New Wave Mom"
"Last Sandwish for Sanchez"

External links
Thunderbirds are Now! official site

Thunderbirds Are Now! albums
2003 EPs